Ecca may refer to:

 Ecca Group, a group of sedimentary geological formations in southern Africa
 Ecca Pass, Eastern Cape province, South Africa
 European Coil Coating Association, non-profit group dedicated to the diffusion of the use of coil and sheet coated metal
 Edmonton City Centre Airport, Edmonton, Alberta, Canada
 Ecca Vandal, South African-born Australian musician
 English Cross Country Association, the governing body of English cross country

See also
 Acca of Hereford (8th century), eighth-century Bishop of Hereford, England
 ECCAS, Economic Community of Central African States